A journal entry is the act of keeping or making records of any transactions either economic or non-economic. 

Transactions are listed in an accounting journal that shows a company's debit and credit balances. The journal entry can consist of several recordings, each of which is either a debit 
or a credit. The total of the debits must equal the total of the credits, or the journal entry is considered unbalanced.

Journal entries can record unique items or recurring items such as depreciation or bond amortization. In accounting software, journal entries are usually entered using a separate module from accounts payable, which typically has its own subledger, that indirectly affects the general ledger. As a result, journal entries directly change the account balances on the general ledger. A properly documented journal entry consists of the correct date, amount(s) that will be debited, amount that will be credited, narration of the transaction, and unique reference number (i.e. check number).

We can better understand about the journal entries through examples. In real business to record the transactions and events and recurring items, we take help of accounting example. For example,  ABC company has sold 1 laptop of $ 300 in  a day on cash. It is simple journal entries cash account debit $ 300 and sales of Laptop account credit $ 100 and rules have followed what comes in business debit and revenue of business must credit. If the Accountant of  DEF company has to pass the journal entries of sale of Fruits, above example helps. He only focus to change name of item, measure unit of quantity and date. Rest fundamental rules of journal entries will same. If learning the rules of journal entries is the skin of anybody, to learn journal entries example is its blood to get energy all time in the body.

Recording

In order to record journal entries, one needs to have knowledge about-:

 Type of Accounts
 Golden Rules of Accounting
 Experience of Working
 Knowledge on debit and credit transactions of accounting

Type of accounts 

There are three types of accounts in accounting:

 Personal accounts are accounts which are related to a legal person. 
 Real accounts are accounts which are related to assets. Intangible assets are also considered as Real Accounts.
 Profit and Loss accounts are related to expenses, losses, income and gains.

There are also subtypes of personal account:

 Natural Personal accounts are the accounts of individuals.
 Artificial Personal accounts are the accounts of companies.
 Representative Personal accounts represent the owner.

See also
 Double-entry bookkeeping system
 Debits and credits
 Single-entry bookkeeping system
 Trial balance a

References

Accounting journals and ledgers